Hajjilar District is in Chaypareh County, West Azerbaijan province, Iran. At the 2006 National Census, its population (as a part of the former Chaypareh District of Khoy County) was 8,856 in 1,953 households. The following census in 2011 counted 8,683 people in 2,291 households, by which time the district was separated from the county, established as Chaypareh County, and divided into two districts. At the latest census in 2016, the district had 8,360 inhabitants in 2,350 households.

References 

Chaypareh County

Districts of West Azerbaijan Province

Populated places in West Azerbaijan Province

Populated places in Chaypareh County